Andranik Timotian-Samarani, commonly known as Andranik "Ando" Teymourian (born 6 March 1983) is an Iranian retired professional footballer who usually played as a defensive midfielder, but could also play as a wide midfielder. He is notably the first Christian to captain the Iran national team.

From 2006 to the end of 2010, he played for three clubs in England, namely Bolton Wanderers and Fulham in the Premier League and Barnsley in the Football League Championship.

Teymourian played his first match for Iran in 2005, and has featured in their squads for the 2006 and 2014 World Cups, and also the 2007, 2011 and 2015 Asian Cups.

Club career

Early career
Andranik was born in Tehran, Iran to ethnic Armenian parents. He started with Oghab F.C. in Iran's Azadegan League, and continued his professional career playing for F.C. Aboomoslem in the Iranian Premier League. In the 2005–06 season, Andranik made 26 appearances for F.C. Aboomoslem and scored one goal.

Bolton Wanderers
In late August 2006 he signed a two-year deal with FA Premier League club Bolton Wanderers, for an undisclosed fee, after being granted a work permit.
He scored his first two goals for Bolton Wanderers in the FA Cup third round in a 4–0 win over Doncaster Rovers on 6 January 2007, in only his third appearance. Andranik then went on to make his full Premier League debut against Fulham on 11 February 2007.  His first two league goals came during a man-of-the-match performance against local rivals Wigan Athletic on 7 April 2007.

Fulham
On 12 June 2008, Andranik signed a two-year contract with Fulham after moving on a free transfer. He made his Fulham debut against Arsenal, in which he helped secure a 1–0 victory. On 2 February 2009, he went on loan to Barnsley of the Football League Championship until the end of the season. He later stated that he wanted to stay with Fulham for the 2009–10 season. On 1 July 2010, Fulham announced that Andranik had been released from his contract with Fulham.

In July 2010, Teymourian was named in Blackburn Rovers' team to face Southport FC in a pre-season friendly.

On 22 July 2010, Teymourian began talks with Sheffield United after turning down a tour with Blackburn Rovers across Australia. Blades coach Gary Speed was believed to have recommended Teymourian to Blades boss Kevin Blackwell as Speed and Teymourian played together at Bolton Wanderers. Teymourian began talks with Blackburn Rovers about a deal to stay with the Premier League club possibly on a short-term deal. The move broke down as he was denied a work permit.

Tractor
On 19 September 2010, Teymourian returned to Iran to join the Tabriz-based club Tractor, the move marked the end of his career in England.

Esteghlal

It was confirmed in mid-July 2011 that Teymourian had signed a contract with Tehran and IPL club Esteghlal. He made his debut for club against Sepahan. On 9 November 2011, he was named as one of the ten finalists for the Asian Player of the Year. He won the Hazfi Cup in his first season.

Al Kharaitiyat
Teymourian signed a one-year deal with Qatari side Al Kharaitiyat SC worth $1.8 million. After his contract ended on 1 July 2013, he left the club.

Return to Esteghlal
On 18 July 2013, Teymourian returned to Esteghlal after signing a three-year contract with the club. He made his debut in a 2–1 loss to Sepahan. He scored a 40-yard goal in a match against Buriram United which Esteghlal won 2–1. Teymourian suffered a broken arm and was out of play for a month. He returned to the fields at the league's two final matches which Esteghlal finished the season at fifth place and missed next years' Champions League.

On 2 August 2014, Teymourian was named the 2013–14 season's best player on the annual awards ceremony of the season.

Return to Tractor
On 27 December 2014, Teymourian joined Tractor again with an 18–month contract. He scored a free-kick on his debut in a match against Saba Qom.

Umm Salal
On 13 July 2015, Teymourian signed with Qatari side Umm Salal. He left the club halfway through the season in January 2016 after a disagreement with the head coach, Bülent Uygun, and with only 14 appearances.

Saipa
On 19 January 2016, Teymourian signed a six-month deal with Saipa, having previously been linked with Tehran-based club Esteghlal and Thailand's Buriram United. Injury caused him to only play four matches for the club before leaving in July 2016.

Machine Sazi
In July 2016 Teymourian returned to Tabriz and signed a one–year contract with newly promoted Persian Gulf Pro League club Machine Sazi.

International career

Teymourian played for Iran national teams at the youth level, before being selected to take part with the senior side. He was a member of the national team during the 2006 World Cup. Pictures of an emotionally and physically drained Teymourian at the end of Iran's last game of the 2006 World Cup have begun to take the shape of Iranian football's most notable photograph from the event. Teymourian dropped to the grass and began sobbing while trainers attended to him. He has started to be recognized as a national hero in Iran because of the passion he showed for his country in the 2006 World Cup. He played in the 2007 and 2011 Asian Cups, as well as the WAFF Championships. The midfielder cemented his spot as a starter next to Javad Nekounam, leading Iran to qualify for the 2014 World Cup.

On 18 May 2014, Teymourian captained Iran in the match against Belarus, making him the first Christian to captain the Iranian national team. On 1 June 2014, he was called into Iran's 2014 FIFA World Cup squad by Carlos Queiroz. He played the full 90 minutes in all three group stage matches, becoming the most capped Iran player at the World Cup with six matches alongside Mehdi Mahdavikia. He was called into Iran's 2015 AFC Asian Cup squad on 30 December 2014 by Carlos Queiroz. He provided three assists in the tournament.

Prior to the start of qualification for the 2018 FIFA World Cup, Teymourian was appointed as the new captain for Iran after Javad Nekounam's retirement.

Teymourian won his 100th cap for the national team in a 1–0 win over Uzbekistan.

Personal life
Andranik's elder brother Serjik Teymourian, was also a football player and played in Germany for 1. FSV Mainz 05 as a defensive midfielder. He died at the age of 46 in 2020, from a traffic collision.

Career statistics

Club

International

Scores and results list Iran's goal tally first, score column indicates score after each Teymourian goal.

Honours
Esteghlal
Hazfi Cup: 2011–12

Naft Tehran
Hazfi Cup: 2016–17

Individual
Persian Gulf Pro League Best Player of the Year: 2013–14
Persian Gulf Pro League Best Midfield of the Year: 2014–15
Persian Gulf Pro League Team of the Year: 2013–14, 2014–15

See also
List of men's footballers with 100 or more international caps

References

External links

 
 
 
 
 
 
 

1983 births
Sportspeople from Tehran
Living people
Iranian people of Armenian descent
Iranian footballers
Iran international footballers
Iranian expatriate footballers
Expatriate footballers in England
Expatriate footballers in Qatar
Iranian expatriate sportspeople in England
Iranian expatriate sportspeople in Qatar
Iranian Christians
Esteghlal F.C. players
F.C. Aboomoslem players
Bolton Wanderers F.C. players
Fulham F.C. players
Barnsley F.C. players
Persian Gulf Pro League players
Premier League players
English Football League players
FIFA Century Club
2006 FIFA World Cup players
2007 AFC Asian Cup players
2011 AFC Asian Cup players
2014 FIFA World Cup players
2015 AFC Asian Cup players
Keshavarz players
F.C. Ararat Tehran players
Al Kharaitiyat SC players
Umm Salal SC players
Qatar Stars League players
Ethnic Armenian sportspeople
Association football midfielders
Machine Sazi F.C. players